Epropetes is a genus of beetles in the family Cerambycidae, containing the following species:

 Epropetes amazonica Galileo & Martins, 2000
 Epropetes atlantica Martins, 1975
 Epropetes bolivianus Galileo & Martins, 2008
 Epropetes deterrima Martins & Napp, 1984
 Epropetes elongata Martins, 1975
 Epropetes hirsuta Martins & Napp, 1984
 Epropetes howdenorum Galileo & Martins, 2000
 Epropetes latifascia (White, 1855)
 Epropetes metallica Martins, 1975
 Epropetes ozodiformis Martins & Napp, 1984
 Epropetes serrana Martins & Napp, 1984
 Epropetes variabile Martins & Galileo, 2005
 Epropetes velutina Martins, 1975
 Epropetes zonula Martins & Napp, 1984

References

Tillomorphini